Zdzierczyzna  is a village in the administrative district of Gmina Sokolniki, within Wieruszów County, Łódź Voivodeship, in central Poland.

References

Zdzierczyzna